Alfred George James Wright (June 23, 1916 – September 5, 2020) was an American bandleader who served as the Director of Bands Emeritus at Purdue University and Chairman of the Board of the John Philip Sousa Foundation.

Early years 
Wright was born in London, England. Whilst still a child he moved with his family to the United States, where he grew up in Pontiac, Michigan. Wright played French horn in high school and earned a music scholarship to the University of Miami in Florida, where he earned both bachelor's (1937) and master's (1947) degrees. He taught band and orchestra at Miami Senior High School from 1938-1954.

Career 
Wright became director of the Purdue All-American Marching Band (AAMB) in 1954, becoming only the second person to hold the position, and served for 27 years until his retirement in 1981. Wright introduced a number of innovations to the Purdue band program, including elaborate football halftime shows and an expanded majorette corps featuring the Golden Girl and Silver Twins. He was also responsible for significantly expanding the band's reach beyond football, including several performances at Radio City Music Hall and international trips to Europe, South America, and Japan.

Honors, distinctions, awards 
In 1981, Wright received an honorary LLD from Troy State University, and, in 1982, Purdue named him a Distinguished Alumnus. Dr. Wright was inducted into the National Band Association Hall of Fame of Distinguished Band Conductors in 1986. Kappa Kappa Psi awarded him the Distinguished Service to Music Medal for concert band and marching band. He was also an honorary member of Phi Mu Alpha Sinfonia.

Personal life and death 
Wright and his wife Gladys lived in West Lafayette, Indiana. He turned 100 in June 2016 and died in September 2020 at the age of 104.

References

External links
Biography on the Sousa Foundation website 
Biography on the Purdue AAMB website
Al Wright Papers - University of Maryland Libraries
 

1916 births
2020 deaths
American bandleaders
American centenarians
American conductors (music)
American male conductors (music)
American music educators
English emigrants to the United States
Musicians from London
People from West Lafayette, Indiana
Purdue University faculty
University of Miami Frost School of Music alumni
Distinguished Service to Music Medal recipients
Men centenarians